Spec Miata is a class of racing car used in Sports Car Club of America (SCCA), National Auto Sport Association (NASA), and Midwestern Council of Sports Car Clubs (MCSCC) road racing events.

The Spec Miata (SM) class is intended to provide the opportunity to compete in low-cost cars with limited modifications, suitable for racing competition. It is intended to encourage low cost, entry level, production car based competition. Spec Miata currently races both sprints and enduros where available.

Mazda MX-5s (also known as Mazda Miata Roadsters) in model years 1990 through 1993 with 1600 cc engines, model years 1994 through 1997 with 1800 cc engines, and model years 1999 through 2005 with 1800 cc engines have been approved by the SCCA for regional racing in all divisions of the SCCA. The class was approved for national SCCA racing beginning in the 2006 racing season.  At the professional level, the SM cars are known as the Global MX-5 Cup.

Spec Miata was first approved as a regional class in the Southwest Division of SCCA in 1999 and the first race as an official class was at the Fiesta Carrera Regional, Texas World Speedway 2.90 road course on July 24, 1999, at 1:05 pm and included a starting field of four drivers:  Tim Evans, Shannon McMasters, Bob Reinhardt and David Obeney finishing in that order.

The first Spec Miata race for the National Auto Sport Association was held in February 2000 by the NorCal Region.  At the national level, the "UPR Racing Supply First Ever Spec Miata National" was held in Avondale, Arizona, at Phoenix International Raceway's infield road course on January 13, 2006 with Brad Rampelberg as the "First Ever" national race winner.
 
Mike Helpin, a local highly respected racer was awarded the 1st place trophy because Brad Rampelberg was disqualified for an undisclosed reason. Brad's disqualification was later overturned by a SCCA board. Brad Rampelberg was named winner in later posted results.
As its name shows, Spec Miata is a "specified" class. This means that the rules for allowable modifications to the car are very strict. The class intends to put drivers on a very even footing by making their cars as identical as possible. The rules are far more conservative than the Improved Touring category, but provide equivalent safety measures.

Because of the support of Mazda through Mazdaspeed, the wide availability of the car on the used market, plentiful and inexpensive parts, and the simplicity of maintenance on the cars, Spec Miata has become a very popular class. Also adding to the appeal is the fact that a Spec Miata can be raced in both SM and ITA/ITS in SCCA regional competition. A typical race-ready Spec Miata can be purchased on the market for $8000–$35,000 depending on race win history and specific modifications.  A new MX-5 Cup (professional class) based on the ND series MX-5 costs $80,000 turnkey, and champions of the national series can win over $200,000 to advance up the motorsport ladder.

In August 2019, Mazda Motorsports and Winding Road Racing announced Spec MX-5, a racing class structure based around the MX-5 NC that is designed to be an affordable, tech-able, reliable and fun-to-drive option for club racers. Spec MX-5 will have select events starting in 2020.

Class rules
This section is not an exhaustive set of rules; it is intended to give an idea of the preparation level of the cars in this class.

Spec Miatas used a specific Bilstein shock with an adjustable coil-over suspension with Eibach springs and adjustable front and rear sway bars. Beginning in 2019 the Bilstein shock is being phased out in favor of a Penske shock. Top mounts are different but otherwise the new setup retains the coilover sleeve and spring from the previous Bilstein setup.

Depending on the club, Toyo or Hoosier tires are specified. For SCCA SM, the Hoosier SM7.5 is the dry tire and SMW (SM Wet) is the wet tire. For NASA, the Toyo RR is the dry tire and RA-1 is the wet tire. (205/50R15) is the spec tire size. Hoosier Tires will provide the spec tire for all National SCCA Events. The wheel size is fixed at 15 × 7, with the wheels weighing no less than 13 pounds.

Cars with 1.6 liter engines (1990-1993) have a race weight of 2275 pounds (1057 kg) and first generation cars with a 1.8 liter displacement engine (1994-1997) have a minimum race weight of 2400 pounds. "NB1 Miatas" (1999-2000) have a minimum weight of 2400 pounds. "NB2 Miatas (2001-2005) have a minimum weight of 2425. Overbore engines are a 15 lb addition.

The 1.8 liter displacement cars may not run an aftermarket air intake and NB models must run a throttle restrictor, while the 1.6 liter displacement cars do not require a restrictor, they may run a modified air box, and may remove the driver corner light. The class calls for "stock" engines with some modifications allowed in the name of balancing factory tolerances. Engine builders have been taking advantage of this for years, and "Top Prep" engines make 10-20 horsepower more than a healthy stock engine and cost several thousand dollars. The full rules for the class may be found in the current Spec Miata Category Specifications of the SCCA rule book, called the GCR (General Competition Rules & Specifications).

SCCA national champions
2022 Nick Bruni, Arlington, VA
2021 Preston Pardus, New Smyrna Beach, Florida
2020 Preston Pardus, New Smyrna Beach, Florida
2019 Todd Buras, Melbourne, Florida
2018 Mark Drennan, San Jose, California
2017 Preston Pardus, New Smyrna Beach, Florida
2016 Justin Hille, Ypsilanti, Michigan
2015 Johnathan Goring, Norfolk, Connecticut
2014 Erik Stearns, Van Buren, Ohio
2013 Jim Drago, Memphis, Tennessee
2012 Jim Drago, Memphis, Tennessee
2011 Elivan Goulart, Shelton, Connecticut
2010 Andrew Charbonneau, Delray Beach, Florida
2009 Steven Gorriaran, Providence, Rhode Island
2008 Eric Foss, Northeast Oklahoma Region
2007 Brad Rampelberg, San Francisco Region
2006 Andrew Caddell, Northwest Region

NASA national champions
2022 Aaron Jeansonne
2021 Preston Pardus
2020 Race was not held. 
2019 Jim Drago
2018 Danny Steyn
2017 Michael Ross (East) 
2017 Tristan Littlehale (West)
2016 Tyler Kicera (East)
2016 Nick Sommers (West)
2015 Mark Drennan (East)
2015 Mark Drennan (West)
2014 Alex Bolanos
2013 Matt Schultz
2012 Yiannis Tsiounis
2011 Nathanial Sparks
2010 Dan Mackeever
2009 Andy Rushing
2008 Todd Lamb
2007 Todd Lamb
2006 Greg Stasiowski

References

General Competition Rules and Specifications, 2006, Sports Car Club of America.
 The current edition of this book is downloadable from the SCCA website at this page.
 Contact MazdaSpeed for parts and support at this page .

External links
Sports Car Club of America
Spec Miata Challenge from the National Auto Sport Association
Mazda Racers - Official Spec Miata and Mazda racing community
Spec RX-7 - Spec Miata alternative

Mazda MX-5
One-make series
Racing cars
Sports Car Club of America